The 1916–17 Trinity Blue and White's basketball team represented Trinity College (later renamed Duke University) during the 1916–17 men's college basketball season. The head coach was Charles Doak, coaching his first season with Trinity. The team finished with an overall record of 20–4.

Schedule

|-

References

Duke Blue Devils men's basketball seasons
Duke
1916 in sports in North Carolina
1917 in sports in North Carolina